The Bonehunters is the sixth volume in Canadian author Steven Erikson's epic fantasy series, the Malazan Book of the Fallen. The Bonehunters is a direct sequel to the fourth volume, House of Chains, and alludes to events in the fifth, Midnight Tides.

The novel was first published in the United Kingdom as a hardcover on 1 March 2006. The first mass-market paperback edition appeared in April 2007. The first United States edition was published in September 2007.

Plot summary
The Bonehunters begins two months after the events of House of Chains. The Malazan Fourteenth Army has destroyed the army of the Whirlwind, and Adjunct Tavore Paran has executed Sha'ik. The Fourteenth is now pressing westward, pursuing the remnants of the Whirlwind rebellion (under Leoman of the Flails), as it seeks refuge in the fortress city of Y'Ghatan, where the Malazan Empire had previously faced its greatest defeat. When the Malazan forces attempt to take the city, Leoman unleashes a destructive fire that tears the city apart. Those few Malazans that escape are re-christened The Bonehunters.

Meanwhile, Onearm's Host, restored to the favour of Empress Laseen, has landed on Seven Cities' north coast to complete the task of subduing the rebellion, but a deadly plague has been unleashed. Ganoes Paran, the new Master of the Deck of Dragons, arrives from Genabackis to help deal with the chaos. With the assistance of the god Shadowthrone, Paran is able to contain the plague by outwitting the goddess Poliel - now an ally of the Crippled God - but is too late to save Dujek, who succumbs to the disease. Paran is declared the new leader of the Host. 

Elsewhere, Mappo is separated from Icarium due to the machinations of the mysterious Nameless Ones. The manipulative Taralack Veed is instated as Icarium's new companion, who leads him into the clutches of the Letherii Empire. The Letherii are seeking challengers to fight the Emperor Rhulad, and this call is also answered by Karsa Orlong. The Letherii clash at sea with the Bonehunters, who are able to escape due to a display of magic by Quick Ben.

The Bonehunters return to the heart of the Malazan Empire, where a confrontation between Tavore and the Empress Laseen results in a fraught flight from the city. Laseen's endless scheming has trapped her in an allegiance with the ruthless Mallick Rel. The escape seemingly claims the life of the assassin Kalam, while Quick Ben is spirited away by Shadowthrone to join a defense of the First Throne against the Letherii. There, Icarium unleashes his full power, placing Taralack Veed in a state of permanent terror. As the Bonehunters depart the Malazan Empire, they are joined by a group of Tiste Andii, among which is Anomander Rake's son Nimander.

Reception
Publishers Weekly called the book "weighty and grim" and that Erikson manages to "keep fans engaged as myriad plot lines tangle and sprawl."

References

External links
 
 

Malazan Book of the Fallen
Canadian fantasy novels
Novels by Steven Erikson
Bantam Books books